USS Paul Jones was a large 1,210-ton sidewheel, double-ended, steam gunboat of the Union Navy that served during the American Civil War. She carried heavy guns and was assigned to the Union blockade of the waterways of the Confederate States of America.

During her tour of duty, she captured blockade runners and bombarded Confederate shore installations. Post-war, she served in the Gulf of Mexico for two years before being decommissioned.

Commissioned at Baltimore, Maryland 

Paul Jones – the first U.S. Navy ship to carry that name—was launched 30 January 1862 by J. J. Abrahams, Baltimore, Maryland, and commissioned 9 June 1862 at Baltimore, Maryland, Commander Charles Steedman in command.

Civil War service

Assigned to the South Atlantic blockade 

Joining the South Atlantic Blockading Squadron, Paul Jones sailed down the coast to engage the fort at Jones Point, Ogeechee River, Georgia, 29 July.

While patrolling on blockade duty, she assisted in capturing schooner Major E. Willis 19 April 1863 off Charleston, South Carolina, and successfully took sloop Mary, loaded with cotton, off St. Simons Sound, Georgia on 8 July.

Attack on Fort Wagner 
Paul Jones participated in attacks on Fort Wagner in Charleston Harbor, (18 July – 24 July) and returned to New York City for repairs until she rejoined her squadron 15 September. She continued her coastal operations until late August 1864 when she sailed to Boston, Massachusetts and decommissioned 19 September.

Post-war service and disposition 

Paul Jones recommissioned at the Boston Navy Yard 1 April 1865 for further service in the Gulf of Mexico. On 31 March 1866 she was stationed at Mobile, Alabama, and in July 1867 she returned to New York City, decommissioned, and was sold on the 13th.

References

External links 

 USS Paul Jones (1862-1867)

Ships of the Union Navy
Ships built in Baltimore
Steamships of the United States Navy
Gunboats of the United States Navy
American Civil War patrol vessels of the United States
1862 ships